Samuel Antálek (born 6 June 1997) is a Slovak footballer who plays for II. liga club Komárno as a defender.

Club career

ŠK Slovan Bratislava
Antálek made his professional Fortuna Liga debut for Slovan Bratislavaon 27 May 2017 against Zemplín Michalovce.

References

External links
 ŠK Slovan Bratislava official club profile 
 
 Futbalnet profile 
 

1997 births
Living people
Slovak footballers
Association football defenders
ŠK Slovan Bratislava players
Slovak Super Liga players
KFC Komárno players
Footballers from Bratislava
2. Liga (Slovakia) players